The 1992 NCAA Division III women's basketball tournament was the 11th annual tournament hosted by the NCAA to determine the national champion of Division III women's collegiate basketball in the United States.

Alma defeated Moravian in the championship game, 79–75, to claim the Scots' first Division III national title. 

The championship rounds were hosted by Moravian College in Bethlehem, Pennsylvania.

Bracket

Final Four

All-tournament team
 Lauri LaBeau, Alma
 Kathy Beck, Moravian
 Pam Porter, Moravian
 Trish Harvey, Luther
 Wendy Rogers, Eastern Connecticut State

See also
1992 NCAA Division III men's basketball tournament
1992 NCAA Division I women's basketball tournament
1992 NCAA Division II women's basketball tournament
1992 NAIA Division I women's basketball tournament
1992 NAIA Division II women's basketball tournament

References

 
NCAA Division III women's basketball tournament
1992 in sports in Pennsylvania